The 2019 European Junior Judo Championships is an edition of the European Junior Judo Championships, organised by the European Judo Union.It was held in Vantaa, Finland from 12 to 15 September 2019. The final day of competition featured a mixed team event, won by team Russia.

Medal summary

Medal table

Men's events

Women's events

Source Results

Mixed

Source Results

References

External links
 

 U21
European Junior Judo Championships
European Championships, U21
Judo competitions in Finland
Judo
Judo, World Championships U21